Shawn Saunders is a retired American soccer defender who played professionally in the USL A-League.

The brother of Josh Saunders, Shawn Saunders attended Woodbridge High School and Santa Margarita High School.   He graduated from Santa Margarita in 1995 and attended Fresno State University.  He played two seasons with Fresno State before turning professional in 1997 with the Colorado Foxes of the USISL A-League.  In February 1998, Saunders signed with the Orange County Zodiac.  He played for Orange County through the 2000 season.  Saunders then moved to Germany to play.  In 2002, he returned to the United States to complete his degree.  He also rejoined Orange County, now known as the Orange County Blue Stars.  In 2004, Saunders signed with the Portland Timbers where he joined his brother Josh.  The Timbers released him in June 2005.  Saunders returned to Orange County for the 2006 and 2007 seasons.

References

Living people
1976 births
American soccer players
American expatriate soccer players
Colorado Foxes players
Fresno State Bulldogs men's soccer players
Orange County Blue Star players
Portland Timbers (2001–2010) players
A-League (1995–2004) players
USL League Two players
USL First Division players
Association football defenders